The 179th New York State Legislature, consisting of the New York State Senate and the New York State Assembly, met from January 6, 1971, to May 12, 1972, during the thirteenth and fourteenth years of Nelson Rockefeller's governorship, in Albany.

Background
Under the provisions of the New York Constitution of 1938, and the U.S. Supreme Court decision to follow the One man, one vote rule, re-apportioned in 1966 by order of the New York Court of Appeals, 57 Senators and 150 assemblymen were elected in single-seat districts for two-year terms. Senate and Assembly districts consisted of approximately the same number of inhabitants, the area being apportioned without restrictions regarding county boundaries.

At this time there were two major political parties: the Republican Party and the Democratic Party. The Conservative Party, the Liberal Party, the Communist Party, the Socialist Workers Party, the Socialist Labor Party, a "Civil Service Independent Party" and an "Independent Alliance" also nominated tickets.

Elections
The New York state election, 1970, was held on November 3.  Governor Nelson Rockefeller and Lieutenant Governor Malcolm Wilson were re-elected, both Republicans. The elections to the other three statewide elective offices resulted in a Republican Attorney General with Liberal endorsement; a Democratic State Comptroller with Liberal endorsement; and a Conservative U.S. Senator with Independent Alliance endorsement. The approximate party strength at this election, as expressed by the vote for Governor, was: Republicans/C.S.I.P. 3,151,000; Democrats/Liberals 2,421,000; Conservatives 423,000; Communists 8,000; Socialist Workers 6,000; and Socialist Labor 4,000. However, Conservative James L. Buckley polled almost 2.3 million votes and was elected to the U.S. Senate.

Three of the four women members of the previous legislature—Assemblywomen Constance E. Cook (Rep.), a lawyer of Ithaca; Rosemary R. Gunning (Cons.), a lawyer of Ridgewood, Queens; and Mary Anne Krupsak (Dem.), a lawyer of Amsterdam—were re-elected.

The New York state election, 1971, was held on November 2. No statewide elective offices were up for election. Two vacancies in the State Senate and four vacancies in the Assembly were filled.

Sessions
The Legislature met for the first regular session (the 194th) at the State Capitol in Albany on January 6, 1971; and adjourned sine die on June 9.

Perry B. Duryea, Jr. (Rep.) was re-elected Speaker.

Earl W. Brydges (Rep.) was re-elected Temporary President of the State Senate.

The Legislature met for a special session at the State Capitol in Albany on December 14, 1971; and adjourned sine die on December 18. This session was called to enact a new apportionment of the state's legislative districts.

The Legislature met for another special session at the State Capitol in Albany on December 27, 1971; and adjourned sine die on January 4, 1972. This session was called to consider measures to balance the state's finances, and ended with the enactment of tax increases.

The Legislature met for the second regular session (the 195th) at the State Capitol in Albany on January 5, 1972; and adjourned sine die on May 12.

On May 9, the Assembly passed a bill to repeal the permissive 1970 abortion law. The bill also passed the Senate, but was vetoed by Governor Rockefeller.

State Senate

Senators
The asterisk (*) denotes members of the previous Legislature who continued in office as members of this Legislature. Assemblymen William J. Giordano and Emanuel R. Gold were elected to fill a vacancies in the Senate.

Note: For brevity, the chairmanships omit the words "...the Committee on (the)..."

Employees
 Secretary: Albert J. Abrams

State Assembly

Assembly members
The asterisk (*) denotes members of the previous Legislature who continued in office as members of this Legislature.

Note: For brevity, the chairmanships omit the words "...the Committee on (the)..."

Employees
 Clerk: Donald A. Campbell

Notes

Sources
 YOUR HELP NEEDED NOW ON ABORTION LEGISLATION! campaign pamphlet issued by NYALR (a member of COFAR [i.e. the Coalition of Organizations for Abortion Rights])

179
1971 in New York (state)
1972 in New York (state)
1971 U.S. legislative sessions
1972 U.S. legislative sessions